Dennis Tetteh (born 6 March 1997) is a Ghanaian professional footballer who plays as a forward for  club Bourj.

Career
In June 2022, Tetteh joined Lebanese Premier League club Bourj.

References

External links 
 
 
 

1997 births
Living people
Ghanaian footballers
Association football forwards
Berekum Chelsea F.C. players
Al Mokawloon Al Arab SC players
El Entag El Harby SC players
Tanta SC players
FC Slavia Mozyr players
Akhaa Ahli Aley FC players
Bourj FC players
Egyptian Premier League players
Belarusian Premier League players
Lebanese Premier League players
Ghanaian expatriate footballers
Ghanaian expatriate sportspeople in Egypt
Ghanaian expatriate sportspeople in Belarus
Ghanaian expatriate sportspeople in Lebanon
Expatriate footballers in Egypt
Expatriate footballers in Belarus
Expatriate footballers in Lebanon